The Camp Street Theatre, American Theatre, or Old American Theatre was a theater in New Orleans between 1824 and 1835.  It was founded by James H. Caldwell to replace the St. Philip Street Theatre as the only English theater in New Orleans. It was considered the finest English speaking theater in the South and was the first building in New Orleans with gas lighting. It was replaced by the St. Charles Theatre and by the New American Theatre, both of which burned down in 1842.

References

19th century in New Orleans
1822 establishments in the United States
Theatres completed in 1822
Former theatres in the United States